HMS LST-424 was a United States Navy  that was transferred to the Royal Navy during World War II. As with many of her class, the ship was never named. Instead, she was referred to by her hull designation.

Construction
LST-424 was laid down on 17 November 1942, under Maritime Commission (MARCOM) contract, MC hull 944, by the Bethlehem-Fairfield Shipyard, Baltimore, Maryland; launched 12 December 1942; then transferred to the United Kingdom and commissioned on 1 February 1943.

Service history 
LST-424 saw no active service in the United States Navy. She was decommissioned and returned to United States Navy custody on 7 January 1946, and struck from the Naval Vessel Register on 21 May 1946. On 3 July 1946, she was sold to Rinaldo De Haag, Italy, and subsequently scrapped.

See also 
 List of United States Navy LSTs

Notes 

Citations

Bibliography 

Online resources

External links

 

Ships built in Baltimore
1942 ships
LST-1-class tank landing ships of the Royal Navy
World War II amphibious warfare vessels of the United Kingdom
S3-M2-K2 ships